Khazineh Anbar-e Qadim (also Romanized as Khazīneh Anbār-e Qadīm) is a village in Marhemetabad-e Shomali Rural District, Marhemetabad District, Miandoab County, West Azerbaijan Province, Iran. At the 2006 census, its population was 427, in 91 families.

References 

Populated places in Miandoab County